= India Health Initiative =

Health charity in Canada

The India Health Initiative (IHI) is a student-run initiative operating in several universities in Ontario, Canada, which aims to send health care professionals and students to various regions in rural India for developmental and educational volunteer work.

== Background ==
Since its inception in 2003, IHI has sent undergrad and graduate students from the University of Western Ontario, University of Toronto and McMaster University. Normally, 3-5 students volunteer for 1–3 months each summer. Students have come from various health backgrounds to create a multidisciplinary team in assessing and treating the underprivileged population of rural south India. They include: nursing, physiotherapy, occupational therapy, psychology, education, kinesiology and medicine.

The target population is youth and children with physical disabilities (mostly because of cerebral palsy or polio, but caused by other pathologies as well); the visually and hearing impaired; and sex workers with HIV/AIDS.

== Goals ==
Although currently based out of the University of Western Ontario, the organization's aims to expand to all major universities in Canada and create a network of multidisciplinary health care professionals with a lifelong interest in volunteering and assisting in international health. They also plan to build links between institutions in Canada and those in India. Finally, IHI plans to progress in the fields of physiotherapy, occupational therapy, speech pathology and psychology in rural areas of India.

== Sponsors and affiliates ==
IHI is recognized by the above universities as well as other organizations in Ontario, the biggest ones being Trillium Health Centre and IBM Canada. IHI receives funding and assistance through Handicare International, a registered charity that raises money for NGOs in rural India, as well as financially sponsoring underprivileged children.
